Uttar Pradesh state has two major road networks.

References

External links 
Uttar Pradesh State Highways Authority Map

 
Uttar Pradesh State Highways
State Highways